Glarus railway station is a railway station in the municipality of Glarus in the Swiss canton of Glarus. It is an intermediate stop on the Ziegelbrücke–Linthal line.

The station is served by Zürich S-Bahn service S25 between Zurich and Linthal, and by St. Gallen S-Bahn service S6 between Rapperswil and Schwanden. Both services operate once per hour, combining to provide two trains per hour between Ziegelbrücke and Schwanden.

The station was opened in 1859, with the completion of the railway from Weesen. However the distinctive station building, designed by Karl August Hiller, was built between 1902 and 1903 as a replacement for an earlier structure. The station building, along with a goods shed dating from 1894, and a locomotive shed and turntable, is inscribed on the Swiss Inventory of Cultural Property of National Significance.

Services 
 the following services stop at Glarus:

References

External links 
 
 

Cultural property of national significance in the canton of Glarus
Glarus
Glarus